The Prisoner of Santa Cruz (Italian: Il prigioniero di Santa Cruz) is a 1941 Italian drama film directed by Carlo Ludovico Bragaglia and starring Juan de Landa, María Mercader, and Giuseppe Rinaldi.

It was shot at Cinecittà Studios in Rome. The film's sets were designed by the art directors Ivo Battelli and Gino Brosio.

Cast

References

Bibliography 
 Roberto Chiti & Roberto Poppi. I film: Tutti i film italiani dal 1930 al 1944. Gremese Editore, 2005.

External links 
 

1941 films
Italian drama films
Italian black-and-white films
1941 drama films
1940s Italian-language films
Films directed by Carlo Ludovico Bragaglia
Films shot at Cinecittà Studios
Lux Film films
1940s Italian films